Faith, Fraud & Minimum Wage is a 2011 comedy film adaption of Canadian playwright Josh MacDonald's play Halo. The film is directed by George Mihalka, and stars Callum Keith Rennie and Martha MacIsaac.

Plot
Rebellious Casey McMullen wrestles with the true nature of miracles when her father begins to believe in a religious hoax which she has secretly created. Casey never knew what a miracle could do, until she created one. Frustrated with her life, Casey throws a cup of coffee at the wall of Krowne Donuts where she works, and the splash seems to closely resemble an image of Jesus Christ. Overnight, Casey finds herself becoming the ring-leader of a growing faith circus. Casey's father, haunted by the aftermath of a family tragedy, is letting everything around him fall apart: his mortgage payments, his business, everything. Casey's hoax might just be the revelation her Dad needs, but the result of Casey's hoax are not at all what she expected.

Cast

Awards 

Nominee for the 2011 DGC craft award for outstanding Achievement in Direction -  George Mihalka 

Only Nova Scotian film chosen to premiere at the 2011 Shanghai Film Festival

External links
 

2010 films
Canadian comedy films
English-language Canadian films
Films directed by George Mihalka
2011 comedy films
2011 films
2010 comedy films
2010s English-language films
2010s Canadian films